Alfons Karl Zwicker (born 22 April 1952) is a Swiss composer, pianist and painter.

Life 
Born in St. Gallen, Zwicker began as a painter and designer. He created several paintings, which were exhibited between 1973 and 1980. Zwicker then studied piano from 1976 to 1981 with Hadassa Schwimmer at Zurich University of the Arts and from 1983 to 1987 with Werner Bärtschi in Zurich. From 1984 to 1988 he studied musical composition with Rudolf Kelterborn at the City of Basel Music Academy.

Afterwards he first appeared as a Neue Musik interpreter and was active as a song accompanist. In 1987 he founded the International Society for Contemporary Music music podium Contrapunkt in St. Gallen to promote contemporary music. He conducted this concert series until 1993.

From 1990 he was active as a composer and in 1993 he attended a master class in Lucerne with the Russian composer Edison Denisov. He then became a member of the composer group Groupe Lacroix in 2000. With them he realized a music project for Paul Klee. In the context of the project  he composed for the  the work «Unter dem Grabhügel» ("Under the Grave Mound") for saxophone and orchestra, which was performed with the soloist Vincent Daoud (saxophone) under the direction of Otto Tausk was premiered on 20 February 2015 in the Tonhalle St. Gallen.

He completed a postgraduate course in Arts Management at the University of Basel in 2002 with a Master of Advanced Studies.

Awards 
 1989: Kulturförderungspreis der Stadt St. Gallen (for contribution to the music podium Contrapunkt)
 1991: Internationaler Bodenseekulturförderungspreis (for compositional work)
 1993: Werkbeitrag des Kantonalen Amts für Kulturpflege St. Gallen (for project Afrikanische Notizen)
 1994: Werkbeitrag der Stiftung Pro Helvetia (for the Orchestra-cyclus Vom Klang der Bilder)
 1997: Werkbeitrag der Stiftung Pro Arte (for the Opera Die Höllenmaschine)
 2003: Kompositionsbeitrag Stiftung Pro Helvetia (for the Opera Der Tod und das Mädchen)
 2004: Förderbeitrag der  (for the Opera Der Tod und das Mädchen)
 2007: Werkbeitrag der Stadt St. Gallen (for Ein weltliches Requiem)
 2012:  – endowed with CHF 20,000 (for experimental music theatre and impressive stage productions)

Werk

Stage music

Operas 
 Die Höllenmaschine. Opera in four acts after Jean Cocteau. premiere 1998 Theater St. Gallen
 Eine Scheidelinie wird weiter herausgezogen. Oper in einem Akt nach der szenischen Dichtung von Nelly Sachs. (Premiere) 2001 Theater St. Gallen
 Der Tod und das Mädchen. Opera in six scenes. Libretto: Daniel Fuchs after Ariel Dorfman's eponymous dramas. Premiere 4 December 2010 Festspielhaus Hellerau

Stage/acting music 
 Nachtduett (1989-1990). Cycle with poems by Georg Trakl for mezzo-soprano, bass, flute, harpsichord, 4 violins, viola, violoncello and double bass.

Vocal music 
 Erfrorene Träume (1990–1992). Cycle after poems by Josef Kopf for mezzo-soprano and ensemble
 Pilgerfahrt zu blauen Eisziegeln (1990–1993) for baritone and piano. Text: Josef Kopf
 Tropfen auf Stein (1995). cycle after poems by Elisabeth Heck for baritone, flute, harp, piano, percussion and viola
 Die Welt braust (1996) for baritone solo after a letter from August Stramm
 Konstellation mit Mondtransit (1998–1999) for soprano, violin, trombone, violoncello, clarinet and piano
 Erinnerung an Nelly Sachs (1999) for 2 flutes, cembalo and female voice
 Empathie (2001–2002) for soprano, violoncello and tape. Text: Else Lasker-Schüler
 Landschaft aus Schreien (2003) for mezzo-soprano and piano. Text: Nelly Sachs
 Mirlitonnades (2007) for mezzo-soprano and 6 instruments. Text: Samuel Beckett
 Dem heiligsten Stern über mir (2009) for alto and piano

Instrumental music

Orchestral music 
 Begegnung mit dem Eis (1992–1993) for medium orchestra
 Vom Klang der Bilder (1987–1996). Cycle for large orchestra and piano solo
 Sprachklang (2004) für solistisches Streichorchester
 L’été symétrique (Le jardin sous les eaux, part 2) (2009–2010) for large orchesra

Chamber music 
 Variationen für Violine solo (1988)
 Diskurs (1988) für Klavier und 2 Trommeln (1 Spieler)
 Rituale für Fada (1994) für Streichquartett
 Postludien (1995–1997) für Violine und Klavier
 Kosmogramm I (1998–1999) für Klavier solo
 Trauernd (2001). Klee-Klang für Oboe, Fagott, Viola und Gitarre
 Verständigung (2002). Erinnerungen aus dem Verlies für Ensemble
 Botschaften des Regens (2003) für Violoncello und Schlagzeug
 Monogramme (2004–2007). 8 Klavierstücke
 Secretum (2006–2007). 8 Stücke nach den Urzeichen des I Ching für Violoncello und Kontrabass
 Monstrosität (2009–2010) für Klavier zu 4 Händen
 Vom Klang der radikalen Architektur (2010). Zyklus für Klavier zu vier Händen
 Hommage à Jean Baudrillard (2010) for Ensemble

Discography 
 Vom Klang der Bilder (Musiques Suisses, 1998). Peter Waters (piano), Bohuslav Martinu Philharmonic Orchestra, Monica Buckland Hofstetter (conductor) 
 Erfrorene Träume (ASM, 1999). Eleanor James, Marc Fournel, Charly Baur, Priska Zaug, Ursula Oelke, Manuel Bärtsch, Juhani Palola, Beatrix Sieber, Leo Gschwend, Jean-Marc Chappuis, Raffael Bietenhader, Jürg Wyttenbach (conductor)
 Rituale für Fada (Classic 2000). Arioso-Quartett St. Gallen
 Groupe Lacroix: 8 Pieces on Paul Klee (Creative Works Records, 2003). Ensemble Sortisatio
 Monogramme (Creative Works Records, 2008). Peter Waters (piano)
 Der Tod und das Mädchen (MGB, 2011).

Literature 
 Adrian Riklin: Die Geburt der Musik aus dem alltäglichen Drama. In Saiten 44 (1997).
 Roland Schönenberg: Reise über Afrika ins Nordlicht. St. Gallen: Komponisten-Portrait Alfons Karl Zwicker. In Dissonanz 55 (1998), .
 Zwicker, Alfons Karl. In Axel Schniederjürgen (ed.): Kürschners Musiker-Handbuch. 5th edition, Saur Verlag, Munich 2006, .
 Zwicker, Alfons Karl. In Wilhelm Kosch, Ingrid Bigler-Marschall (ed.): Deutsches Theater-Lexikon. Biographisches und bibliographisches Handbuch. VOl. 7: Wolbring–Zysset, De Gruyter, Berlin [among others] 2011, .
 Lisa D. Nolte: Blutrote Betroffenheit. Alfons Karl Zwickers Oper Der Tod und das Mädchen am Theater St. Gallen (September bis November 2011). In Dissonanz 117 (2012), .

References

External links 
 Alfons Karl Zwicker in der MusicSack-Datenbank
 Webseite von Alfons Karl Zwicker
 

20th-century classical composers
Swiss opera composers
Swiss classical pianists
Classical accompanists
1952 births
Living people
People from the canton of St. Gallen
20th-century Swiss composers